Stavri Lubonja (born September 1935) is a former Albanian player and manager.

Playing career

Club
He spent his six-year football-playing career with capital club Dinamo Tirana, winning three national championships.

During the 1959 season, Lubonja was the league top goalscorer with 11 goals, with Dinamo, who finished in 3rd place.

Managerial career
Lubonja also served at Dinamo Tirana as the manager, winning the league in the 1979–80 season.

Personal life
Lubonja is married with his long-time partner Mediha Lubonja (née Veçani), who was a dancer. He also holds American citizenship, since his father had emigrated to the USA only to return to Korçë in 1931, four years before Stavri was born.

Honours
Albanian Superliga: 1
 1955, 1956, 1960

References

1935 births
Living people
Footballers from Tirana
Albanian footballers
Association football forwards
FK Dinamo Tirana players
Albanian football managers
Flamurtari Vlorë managers
FK Dinamo Tirana managers
Kategoria Superiore managers